John McCaw Jr. (c. 1951) is a businessman who formerly partly owned McCaw Cellular in Seattle, Washington and a former part-owner of the Vancouver Canucks NHL franchise, with Francesco Aquilini.

Education
A graduate of the Lakeside School, he continued his education at the University of Washington, graduating with a psychology degree in 1974.

Career 
McCaw owned the NBA's Vancouver Grizzlies from 1995 to 2000, when he sold the team to interests which would move it to Memphis.

On November 8, 2006, his 50% interest in the Canucks was sold to Aquilini, who became the sole owner.

On August 6, 2018, he was identified as a new part-owner of the Force India Formula One racing team.

See also
 Craig McCaw

References

Bill Knight, Mariners Owners to Pitch New Stadium (Monday, August 14, 1995).

1950s births
Living people
National Hockey League executives
National Hockey League owners
National Basketball Association executives
National Basketball Association owners
Businesspeople from Vancouver
Ice hockey people from Vancouver
Vancouver Canucks executives
20th-century American businesspeople
University of Washington College of Arts and Sciences alumni
Lakeside School alumni